Raymond Destin is a Martiniquais football manager. He was the first manager to coach the Martinique national team at the CONCACAF Gold Cup.

Palmarès 
Martinique national football team
Caribbean Cup:
 1993
CONCACAF Gold Cup:
 1st round

RC Rivière-Pilote
Coupe de Martinique:
 finalist: 2002

External links

Profile at Soccerpunter.com

Year of birth missing (living people)
Living people
Martiniquais football managers
Martinique national football team managers
Place of birth missing (living people)